MFB may refer to:

 Marxist Forward Bloc, a political party in India
 Medial forebrain bundle, a neural pathway containing fibers
 Metropolitan Fire Brigade (Melbourne), a fire service in Victoria, Australia
 Motional Feedback (also MFB), an active high fidelity loudspeaker system
 Mumbai Fire Brigade, a fire service in Mumbai, Maharashtra, India